Carlos Freire may refer to:

 Carlos do Amaral Freire, Brazilian scholar, linguist and translator
 Carlos Freire (footballer) (born 1959), Portuguese retired footballer